Yaxley is an English toponymic surname, which along with dialectal variants, Yexley, Yoakley, Yockley, and Yokley, may derive from any of the English places that bore this name, including Yaxley, Cambridgeshire (formerly Huntingdonshire) and Yaxley, Suffolk. "Yacksley" is a variant form.

People with the surname include:

 Francis Yaxley, (died 1565), English politician and conspirator
 Greta Yaxley, (born 2000), television cook
 John Yaxley, (died c. 1625), English lawyer and MP
 John Francis Yaxley, (born 1936), former civil servant in the UK Colonial Office
 Peter Yaxley, (1928–2015), New Zealand rugby league player and referee
 Richard Yaxley, (1560–1589), Catholic martyr
 Robert Yaxley, (1912–1943)  Royal Air Force pilot and commander during the Second World War
 Sandra Yaxley, (born 1968), Australian swimmer with cerebral palsy, won gold in 1988 and 1992 Summer Paralympics
 Stephen Yaxley-Lennon, (born 1982), better known as Tommy Robinson (activist), a British far-right political activist

Footnotes

British families
English toponymic surnames